Joan Elisabeth Adler (born 13 June 1950, in Sydney, Australia) is a computational physicist at the Technion – Israel Institute of Technology. Her research involves percolation theory, lattice models, and neural networks.

Biography 
Adler graduated with a B.Sc. in mathematics and physics from the University of Sydney in 1974. She completed her doctorate in physics in 1980, at the University of New South Wales. She worked at the Technion from 1980 to 1984 as a postdoctoral fellow and research associate, returned as a senior research associate in 1988, and became a senior research fellow in 2000. She was president of the Israel Physical Society from 2005–2007.

At Russell Berrie Nanotechnology Institute Technion–Israel Institute of Technology in Haifa, her recent research has included atomistic and electronic simulation and visualization for condensed matter and materials (including nanotubes), computational physics education, and statistical physics. She has also studied 3D stereo visualization for physics education and interopability of multiscale simulations.

In 2005, Adler became a Fellow of the Institute of Physics (Great Britain).

Distinctions 
 1970–1973: Commonwealth Undergraduate Scholarship
 1975–1978: Australian Postgraduate Research Award
 1980–1983: Lady Davis Postdoctoral Fellowship
 1987: PICS French-Israeli Travel Award

Select publications 
 Adler, Joan, Yigal Meir, Amnon Aharony, and A. Brooks Harris. "Series study of percolation moments in general dimension." Physical Review B 41, no. 13 (1990): 9183.
 Adler, Joan. "Bootstrap percolation." Physica A: Statistical Mechanics and its Applications 171, no. 3 (1991): 453-470.
 Hashibon, Adham, Joan Adler, Michael W. Finnis, and Wayne D. Kaplan. "Atomistic study of structural correlations at a liquid-solid interface." Computational materials science 24, no. 4 (2002): 443-452.
 Adler, Joan, and Uri Lev. "Bootstrap percolation: visualizations and applications." Brazilian Journal of Physics 33 (2003): 641-644.

References

External links
Home page

1950 births
Living people
Scientists from Sydney
Australian physicists
Israeli physicists
Australian women physicists
University of Sydney alumni
University of New South Wales alumni
Academic staff of Technion – Israel Institute of Technology
Fellows of the Institute of Physics
Computational physicists